Novonikolsky is a rural locality (a village) in Tugaysky Selsoviet, Blagoveshchensky District, Bashkortostan, Russia. The population was 21 as of 2010. There are 2 streets.

Geography 
Novonikolsky is located 34 km southwest of Blagoveshchensk (the district's administrative centre) by road. Rudny is the nearest rural locality.

References 

Rural localities in Blagoveshchensky District